Elliottia racemosa, the Georgia plume or summer plume, is a plant in the family Ericaceae, and is endemic to the U.S. state of Georgia.

The plant is found in habitats of moist stream banks to dry ridges, and are usually in sandy soil.   It is found at scattered locations in eastern and southern Georgia.

Description
Elliottia racemosa is a rarely occurring species of shrub or sometimes small tree. The leaves are three to four inches long and one to two inches wide.  It blooms with white flowers, with four petals. It produces a dry fruit.

The shrub was discovered and illustrated by William Bartram in 1775 and later rediscovered and described in 1808 by the South Carolina botanist Stephen Elliott. The species is listed as threatened.

References

Ericoideae
Endemic flora of Georgia (U.S. state)
Threatened flora of the United States